Steely Dan is an American rock band founded in 1971 in New York by Walter Becker (guitars, bass, backing vocals) and Donald Fagen (keyboards, lead vocals).  Initially the band had a stable lineup, but in 1974 Becker and Fagen retired from live performances to become a studio-only band, opting to record with a revolving cast of session musicians. Rolling Stone has called them "the perfect musical antiheroes for the seventies".

Becker and Fagen played together in a variety of bands from their time together studying at Bard College in Annandale-on-Hudson, New York.  They later moved to Los Angeles, gathered a band of musicians, and began recording albums.  Their first album, Can't Buy a Thrill (1972),  established a template for their career, blending elements of rock, jazz, Latin music, R&B, blues, and sophisticated studio production with cryptic and ironic lyrics.  The band enjoyed critical and commercial success through seven studio albums, peaking with their top-selling album Aja, released in 1977.  After the group disbanded in 1981, Becker and Fagen worked sporadically on solo projects through the 1980s, though a cult following remained devoted to the group's work. Since reuniting in 1993, Steely Dan has toured steadily and released two albums of new material, the first of which, Two Against Nature, earned a Grammy Award for Album of the Year.  Their final album of new studio material was 2003's Everything Must Go, though the band has continued to release compilations, box sets, and live albums on a regular basis.  After Becker's death in 2017, Fagen reluctantly continued the group with himself as the sole official member.

They have sold more than 40 million albums worldwide and were inducted into the Rock and Roll Hall of Fame in March 2001. VH1 ranked Steely Dan at No. 82 on their list of the 100 Greatest Musical Artists of All Time. Rolling Stone ranked them No. 15 on its list of the 20 greatest duos of all time.

History

Formative and early years (1967–1972)
Becker and Fagen met in 1967 at Bard College, in Annandale-on-Hudson, New York. As Fagen passed by a café, The Red Balloon, he heard Becker practicing the electric guitar. In an interview, Fagen recounted the experience: "I hear this guy practising, and it sounded very professional and contemporary. It sounded like, you know, like a black person, really." He introduced himself to Becker and asked, "Do you want to be in a band?" Discovering that they enjoyed similar music, the two began writing songs together.

Becker and Fagen began playing in local groups. One such group – known as the Don Fagen Jazz Trio, the Bad Rock Group and later the Leather Canary – included future comedy star Chevy Chase on drums. They played covers of songs by The Rolling Stones ("Dandelion"), Moby Grape ("Hey Grandma"), and Willie Dixon ("Spoonful"), as well as some original compositions. Terence Boylan, another Bard musician, remembered that Fagen took readily to the beatnik life while attending college: "They never came out of their room, they stayed up all night. They looked like ghosts—black turtlenecks and skin so white that it looked like yogurt. Absolutely no activity, chain-smoking Lucky Strikes and dope."

After Fagen graduated in 1969, the two moved to Brooklyn and tried to peddle their tunes in the Brill Building in midtown Manhattan. Kenny Vance (of Jay and the Americans), who had a production office in the building, took an interest in their music, which led to work on the soundtrack of the low-budget film (featuring Richard Pryor and Robert Downey Sr.) You've Got to Walk It Like You Talk It or You'll Lose That Beat. Becker later said bluntly, "We did it for the money." A series of demos from 1968 to 1971 are available in multiple different releases, not authorized by Becker and Fagen. This collection features approximately 25 tracks and is notable for its sparse arrangements (Fagen plays solo piano on many songs) and lo-fi production, a contrast with Steely Dan's later work. Although some of these songs ("Caves of Altamira", "Brooklyn", "Barrytown") were re-recorded for Steely Dan albums, most were never officially released.

In 1970, Gary Katz produced an album by Linda Hoover, I Mean to Shine, featuring Fagen, Becker, and Jeff "Skunk" Baxter, and including five Becker/Fagen songs. The album was shelved over songwriting licensing issues, but was finally released 52 years later, in 2022.

Becker and Fagen joined the touring band of Jay and the Americans for about a year and a half. They were at first paid $100 per show, but partway through their tenure the band's tour manager cut their salaries in half. The group's lead singer, Jay Black, dubbed Becker and Fagen "the Manson and Starkweather of rock 'n' roll", referring to cult leader Charles Manson and spree killer Charles Starkweather.

They had little success after moving to Brooklyn, although Barbra Streisand recorded their song "I Mean To Shine" on her 1971 Barbra Joan Streisand album. Their fortunes changed when one of Vance's associates, Gary Katz, moved to Los Angeles to become a staff producer for ABC Records. He hired Becker and Fagen as staff songwriters; they flew to California. Katz would produce all their 1970s albums in collaboration with engineer Roger Nichols. Nichols would win six Grammy Awards for his work with the band from the 1970s to 2001.

Also realizing that their songs were too complex for other ABC artists, at Katz's suggestion Becker and Fagen formed their own band with guitarists Denny Dias and Jeff "Skunk" Baxter, drummer Jim Hodder and singer David Palmer, and Katz signed them to ABC as recording artists. Fans of Beat Generation literature, Fagen and Becker named the band after a "revolutionary" steam-powered dildo mentioned in the William S. Burroughs novel Naked Lunch. Palmer joined as a second lead vocalist because of Fagen's occasional stage fright, his reluctance to sing in front of an audience, and because the label believed that his voice was not "commercial" enough.

In 1972, ABC issued Steely Dan's first single, "Dallas", backed with "Sail the Waterway". Distribution of "stock" copies available to the general public was apparently extremely limited; the single sold so poorly that promotional copies are much more readily available than stock copies in today's collectors market. As of 2015, "Dallas" and "Sail the Waterway" are the only officially released Steely Dan tracks that have not been reissued on cassette or compact disc. In an interview (1995), Becker and Fagen called the songs "stinko."   "Dallas" was later covered by Poco on their Head Over Heels album.

Can't Buy a Thrill and Countdown to Ecstasy (1972–1973)
Can't Buy a Thrill, Steely Dan's debut album, was released in 1972. Its hit singles "Do It Again" and "Reelin' In the Years" reached No. 6 and No. 11 respectively on the Billboard singles chart. Along with "Dirty Work" (sung by David Palmer), the songs became staples on radio.

Because of Fagen's reluctance to sing live, Palmer handled most of the vocal duties on stage. During the first tour, however, Katz and Becker decided that they preferred Fagen's interpretations of the band's songs, persuading him to take over. Palmer quietly left the group while it recorded its second album; he later co-wrote the No. 2 hit "Jazzman" (1974) with Carole King. Village Voice rock critic Robert Christgau was pleased with the elevation of Fagen, noting that Palmer "fit in like a cheerleader at a crap game."

Released in 1973, Countdown to Ecstasy was not as commercially successful as Steely Dan's first album. Becker and Fagen were unhappy with some of the performances on the record and believed that it sold poorly because it had been recorded hastily on tour. The album's singles were "Show Biz Kids" and "My Old School", both of which stayed in the lower half of the Billboard charts (though "My Old School" and—to a lesser extent—"Bodhisattva" became FM Rock staples in time).

Pretzel Logic and Katy Lied (1974–1976)

Pretzel Logic was released in early 1974. A diverse set, it includes the group's most successful single, "Rikki Don't Lose That Number" (No. 4 on the Billboard Hot 100), and a note-for-note rendition of Duke Ellington and James "Bubber" Miley's "East St. Louis Toodle-Oo".

During the previous album's tour, the band had added vocalist-percussionist Royce Jones, vocalist-keyboardist Michael McDonald, and session drummer Jeff Porcaro. Porcaro played the sole drum track on one song, "Night By Night" on Pretzel Logic (Jim Gordon played drums on all the remaining tracks, and he and Porcaro both played on "Parker's Band"), reflecting Steely Dan's increasing reliance on session musicians (including Dean Parks and Rick Derringer). Jeff Porcaro and Katy Lied pianist David Paich would go on to form Toto. Striving for perfection, Becker and Fagen sometimes asked musicians to record as many as forty takes of each track.

Pretzel Logic was the first Steely Dan album to feature Walter Becker on guitar. "Once I met [session musician] Chuck Rainey", he explained, "I felt there really was no need for me to be bringing my bass guitar to the studio anymore".

A rift began growing between Becker-Fagen and Steely Dan's other members (particularly Baxter and Hodder), who wanted to tour. Becker and Fagen disliked constant touring and wanted to concentrate solely on writing and recording. The other members gradually left the band, discouraged by this and by their diminishing roles in the studio.  However, Dias remained with the group until 1980's Gaucho and Michael McDonald contributed vocals until the group's twenty-year hiatus after Gaucho. Baxter and McDonald went on to join The Doobie Brothers. Steely Dan's last tour performance was on July 5, 1974, a concert at the Santa Monica Civic Auditorium in California.

Becker and Fagen recruited a diverse group of session players for Katy Lied (1975), including Porcaro, Paich, and McDonald, as well as guitarist Elliott Randall, jazz saxophonist Phil Woods, saxophonist/bass-guitarist Wilton Felder, percussionist/vibraphonist/keyboardist Victor Feldman, keyboardist (and later producer) Michael Omartian, and guitarist Larry Carlton—Dias, Becker, and Fagen being Steely Dan's only original members. The album went gold on the strength of "Black Friday" and "Bad Sneakers", but Becker and Fagen were so dissatisfied with the album's sound (compromised by a faulty DBX noise reduction system) that they publicly apologized for it (on the album's back cover) and for years refused to listen to it in its final form. Katy Lied also included "Doctor Wu" and "Chain Lightning".

The Royal Scam and Aja (1976–1978)
The Royal Scam was released in May 1976. Partly because of Carlton's prominent contributions, it is the band's most guitar-oriented album. It also features performances by session drummer Bernard Purdie. The album sold well in the United States, though without the strength of a hit single. In the UK the single "Haitian Divorce" (Top 20) drove album sales, becoming Steely Dan's first major hit there.
Steely Dan's sixth album, the jazz-influenced Aja,  was released in September 1977. Aja reached the Top Five in the U.S. charts within three weeks, winning the Grammy award for "Engineer – Best Engineered Recording – Non-Classical."  It was also one of the first American LPs to be certified 'platinum' for sales of over 1 million albums.

Featuring Michael McDonald's backing vocals, "Peg" (No. 11) was the album's first single, followed by "Josie" (No. 26) and "Deacon Blues" (No. 19). Aja solidified Becker's and Fagen's reputations as songwriters and studio perfectionists. It features such jazz and fusion luminaries as guitarists Larry Carlton and Lee Ritenour; bassist Chuck Rainey; saxophonists Wayne Shorter, Pete Christlieb, and Tom Scott; drummers Steve Gadd, Rick Marotta and Bernard Purdie; pianist Joe Sample and ex-Miles Davis pianist/vibraphonist Victor Feldman and Grammy award-winning producer/arranger Michael Omartian (piano).

Planning to tour in support of Aja, Steely Dan assembled a live band. Rehearsal ended and the tour was canceled when backing musicians began comparing pay. The album's history was documented in an episode of the TV and DVD series Classic Albums.

After Aja's success, Becker and Fagen were asked to write the title track for the movie FM. The movie was a box-office disaster, but the song was a hit, earning Steely Dan another engineering Grammy award. It was a minor hit in the UK and barely missed the Top 20 in the U.S.A.

Gaucho and breakup (1978–1981)

Becker and Fagen took a break from songwriting for most of 1978 before starting work on Gaucho. The project would not go smoothly: technical, legal, and personal setbacks delayed the album's release and subsequently led Becker and Fagen to suspend their partnership for over a decade.

Misfortune struck early when an assistant engineer accidentally erased most of "The Second Arrangement", a favorite track of Katz and Nichols, which was never recovered. More trouble — this time legal — followed. In March 1979, MCA Records bought ABC, and for much of the next two years Steely Dan could not release an album. Becker and Fagen had planned on leaving ABC for Warner Bros. Records, but MCA claimed ownership of their music, preventing them from changing labels.

Turmoil in Becker's personal life also interfered. His girlfriend died of a drug overdose in their Upper West Side apartment, and he was sued for $17 million. Becker settled out of court, but he was shocked by the accusations and by the tabloid press coverage that followed. Soon after, Becker was struck by a taxi while crossing a Manhattan street, shattering his right leg in several places and forcing him to use crutches.

Still more legal trouble was to come. Jazz composer Keith Jarrett sued Steely Dan for copyright infringement, claiming that they had based Gaucho's title track on one of his compositions, "Long As You Know You're Living Yours" (Fagen later admitted that he'd loved the song and that it had been a strong influence).

Gaucho was finally released in November 1980. Despite its tortured history, it was another major success. The album's first single, "Hey Nineteen", reached No. 10 on the pop chart in early 1981, and "Time Out of Mind" (featuring guitarist Mark Knopfler of Dire Straits) was a moderate hit in the spring. "My Rival" was featured in John Huston's 1980 film Phobia. Roger Nichols won a third engineering Grammy award for his work on the album.

Time off (1981–1993)
Steely Dan disbanded in June 1981. Becker moved to Maui, where he became an "avocado rancher and self-styled critic of the contemporary scene." He stopped using drugs, which he had used for most of his career. Meanwhile, Fagen released a solo album, The Nightfly (1982), which went platinum in both the U.S. and the UK and yielded the Top-20 hit "I.G.Y. (What a Beautiful World)." In 1988 Fagen wrote the score of Bright Lights, Big City and a song for its soundtrack, but otherwise recorded little. He occasionally did production work for other artists, as did Becker. The most prominent of these were two albums Becker produced for the British sophisti-pop group China Crisis, who were strongly influenced by Steely Dan. Becker is listed as an official member of China Crisis on the first of these albums, 1985's Flaunt the Imperfection, and played keyboards on the band's Top 20 UK hit "Black Man Ray". For the second of the two albums, 1989's Diary of a Hollow Horse, Becker is only listed as a producer and not as a band member.

In 1986 Becker and Fagen performed on Zazu, an album by former model Rosie Vela produced by Gary Katz.  The two rekindled their friendship and held songwriting sessions between 1986 and 1987, leaving the results unfinished.  On October 23, 1991, Becker attended a concert by New York Rock and Soul Revue, co-founded by Fagen and producer/singer Libby Titus (who was for many years the partner of Levon Helm of The Band and would later become Fagen's wife), and spontaneously performed with the group.

Becker produced Fagen's second solo album, Kamakiriad, in 1993. Fagen conceived the album as a sequel to The Nightfly.

Reunion, Alive in America (1993–2000)

Becker and Fagen reunited for an American tour to support Kamakiriad, which sold poorly despite a Grammy nomination for Album of the Year. With Becker playing lead and rhythm guitar, the pair assembled a band that included a second keyboard player, second lead guitarist, bassist, drummer, vibraphonist, three female backing singers, and four-piece saxophone section. Among the musicians from the live band, several would continue to work with Steely Dan over the next decade, including bassist Tom Barney and saxophone players Cornelius Bumpus and Chris Potter.  During this tour, Fagen introduced himself as "Rick Strauss" and Becker as "Frank Poulenc".

The next year, MCA released Citizen Steely Dan, a boxed set featuring their entire catalog (except their debut single "Dallas"/"Sail The Waterway") on four CDs, plus four extra tracks: "Here at the Western World" (originally released on 1978's "Greatest Hits"), "FM" (1978 single), a 1971 demo of "Everyone's Gone to the Movies" and "Bodhisattva (live)", the latter recorded on a cassette in 1974 and released as a B-side in 1980. That year Becker released his debut solo album, 11 Tracks of Whack, which Fagen co-produced.

Steely Dan toured again in support of the boxed set and Tracks. In 1995 they released a live CD, Alive in America, compiled from recordings of several 1993 and 1994 concerts. The Art Crimes Tour followed, including dates in the United States, Japan, and their first European shows in 22 years. After this activity, Becker and Fagen returned to the studio to begin work on a new album.

Two Against Nature and Everything Must Go (2000–2003)
In 2000 Steely Dan released their first studio album in 20 years: Two Against Nature. It won four Grammy Awards: Best Engineered Album – Non-Classical, Best Pop Vocal Album, Best Pop Performance by Duo or Group with Vocal ("Cousin Dupree"), and Album of the Year (despite competition in this category from Eminem's The Marshall Mathers LP and Radiohead's Kid A). In the summer of 2000, they began another American tour, followed by an international tour later that year.  The tour featured guitarist Jon Herington, who would go on to play with the band over the next two decades.  The group released the Plush TV Jazz-Rock Party DVD, documenting a live-in-the-studio concert performance of popular songs from throughout Steely Dan's career. In March 2001, Steely Dan was inducted into the Rock and Roll Hall of Fame.

In 2002 during the recording of Everything Must Go, Becker and Fagen fired their engineer Roger Nichols, who had worked with them for 30 years, without explanation or notification, according to band biographer Brian Sweet's 2018 revision of his book Reelin' in the Years.

In 2003 Steely Dan released Everything Must Go.  In contrast to their earlier work, they had tried to write music that captured a live feel. Becker sang lead vocals on a Steely Dan studio album for the first time ("Slang of Ages" — he had sung lead on his own "Book of Liars" on Alive in America). Fewer session musicians played on Everything Must Go than had become typical of Steely Dan albums: Becker played bass on every track and lead guitar on five tracks; Fagen added piano, electric piano, organ, synthesizers, and percussion on top of his vocals; touring drummer Keith Carlock played on every track.

Touring, solo activity (2003–2017)
To complete his Nightfly trilogy, Fagen issued Morph the Cat in 2006.  Steely Dan returned to annual touring that year with the Steelyard "Sugartooth" McDan and The Fab-Originees.com Tour. Despite much fluctuation in membership, the live band featured mainstays Herington, Carlock, bassist Freddie Washington, the horn section of Michael Leonhart, Jim Pugh, Roger Rosenberg, and Walt Weiskopf, and backing vocalists Carolyn Leonhart and Cindy Mizelle. The 2007 Heavy Rollers Tour included dates in North America, Europe, Japan, Australia, and New Zealand, making it their most expansive tour.

The smaller Think Fast Tour followed in 2008, with keyboardist Jim Beard joining the live band. That year Becker released a second album, Circus Money, produced by Larry Klein and inspired by Jamaican music. In 2009 Steely Dan toured Europe and America extensively in their Left Bank Holiday and Rent Party Tour, alternating between standard one-date concerts at large venues and multi-night theater shows that featured performances of The Royal Scam, Aja, or Gaucho in their entirety on certain nights. The following year, Fagen formed the touring supergroup Dukes of September Rhythm Revue with McDonald, Boz Scaggs, and members of Steely Dan's live band, whose repertoire included songs by all three songwriters. Longtime studio engineer Roger Nichols died of pancreatic cancer on April 10, 2011. Steely Dan's Shuffle Diplomacy Tour that year included an expanded set list and dates in Australia and New Zealand.  Fagen released his fourth album, Sunken Condos, in 2012.  It was his first solo release unrelated to the Nightfly trilogy.

The Mood Swings: 8 Miles to Pancake Day Tour began in July 2013 and featured an eight-night run at the Beacon Theatre in New York City.  Jamalot Ever After, their 2014 United States tour, ran from July 2 in Portland, Oregon to September 20 in Port Chester, New York.  2015's Rockabye Gollie Angel Tour included opening act Elvis Costello and the Imposters and dates at the Coachella Valley Music and Arts Festival.  The Dan Who Knew Too Much tour followed in 2016, with Steve Winwood opening.  Steely Dan also performed at The Hollywood Bowl in Los Angeles with an accompanying orchestra.

The band played its final shows with Becker in 2017.  In April, they played the 12-date Reelin' In the Chips residency in Las Vegas and Southern California.  Becker's final performance came on May 27 at the Greenwich Town Party in Greenwich, Connecticut.  Due to illness, Becker did not play Steely Dan's two Classics East and West concerts at Dodger Stadium and Citi Field in July.  Fagen embarked on a tour that summer with a new backing band, The Nightflyers.

After Becker's death (2017–present)
Becker died from complications of esophageal cancer on September 3, 2017. In a note released to the media, Fagen remembered his longtime friend and bandmate, and promised to "keep the music we created together alive as long as I can with the Steely Dan band."  After Becker's death, Steely Dan honored commitments to perform a short North American tour in October 2017 and three concert dates in the United Kingdom and Ireland for Bluesfest on a double bill with the Doobie Brothers. The band played its first concert following Becker's death in Thackerville, Oklahoma, on October 13. In tribute to Becker, they performed his solo song "Book of Liars", with Fagen singing the lead vocals, at several concerts on the tour.

Becker's widow and estate sued Fagen later that year, arguing that the estate should control 50% of the band's shares. Fagen filed a counter suit, arguing that the band had drawn up plans in 1972 stating that band members leaving the band or dying relinquish shares of the band's output to the surviving members.  In December, Fagen said that he would rather have retired the Steely Dan name after Becker's death, and would instead have toured with the current iteration of the group under another name, but was persuaded not to by promoters for commercial reasons.

In 2018, Steely Dan performed on a summer tour of the United States with The Doobie Brothers as co-headliners. The band also played a nine-show residency at the Beacon Theatre in New York City that October. In February 2019, the band embarked on a tour of Great Britain with Steve Winwood. Guitarist Connor Kennedy of The Nightflyers joined the live band, beginning with a nine-night residency at The Venetian Resort in Las Vegas in April 2019.

As of September 2021, the legal battle over the band's royalties was still ongoing, with Fagen speculating during an interview that "thousands of lawyers" were probably involved in the dispute.

Musical and lyrical style

Music

Overall sound
Steely Dan's albums are notable for the characteristically 'warm' and 'dry' production sound, and the sparing use of echo and reverberation.

Backing vocals
Becker and Fagen favored a distinctly soul-influenced style of backing vocals, which after the first few albums were almost always performed by a female chorus (although Michael McDonald features prominently on several tracks, including the 1975 song "Black Friday" and the 1977 song "Peg"). Venetta Fields, Sherlie Matthews and Clydie King were the preferred trio for backing vocals on the group's late 1970s albums. Other backing vocalists include Timothy B. Schmit, Tawatha Agee, Carolyn Leonhart, Janice Pendarvis, and Catherine Russell. The band also featured singers like Patti Austin and Valerie Simpson on later projects such as Gaucho.

Horns
Horn arrangements have been used on songs from all Steely Dan albums. They typically feature instruments such as trumpets, trombones and saxophones, although they have also used other instruments such as flutes and clarinets. The horn parts occasionally integrate simple synth lines to alter the tone quality of individual horn lines; for example in "Deacon Blues" this was done to "thicken" one of the saxophone lines. On their earlier albums Steely Dan featured guest arrangers and on their later albums the arrangement work is credited to Fagen.

Composition and chord use
Steely Dan is famous for their use of chord sequences and harmonies that explore the area of musical tension between traditional pop sounds and jazz. In particular, they are known for their use of the add 2 chord, a type of added tone chord, which they nicknamed the "mu major". The mu major chord differs from a suspended second (sus2) chord, as suspended chords do not contain the major (or minor) third. In a 1989 interview, Walter Becker explained that the use of the chord developed from trying to enrich the sound of a major chord without making it into a "jazz chord". In the Steely Dan Songbook, Becker and Donald Fagen state that "inversions of the mu major may be formed in the usual manner with one caveat: the voicing of the second and third scale tones, which is the essence of the chord's appeal, should always occur as a whole tone dissonance." Other common chords used by Steely Dan include slash chords.

Lyrics

Steely Dan's lyrical subjects are diverse, but in their basic approach they often create fictional personae that participate in a narrative or situation. The duo have said that in retrospect, most of their albums have a "feel" of either Los Angeles or New York City, the two main cities where Becker and Fagen lived and worked. Characters appear in their songs that evoke these cities. Steely Dan's lyrics are often puzzling to the listener, with the true meaning of the song "uncoded" through repeated listening, and a richer understanding of the references within the lyrics. In the song "Everyone's Gone to the Movies", the line "I know you're used to 16 or more, sorry we only have eight" refers not to the count of some article, but to 8 mm film, which was lower quality than 16 mm or larger formats and often used for pornography, underscoring the illicitness of Mr. LaPage's movie parties.

Some have argued that Steely Dan never wrote a genuine love song, instead dealing with personal passion in the guise of a destructive obsession.  Many of their songs concern love, but typical of Steely Dan songs is an ironic or disturbing twist in the lyrics that reveals a darker reality. For example, expressed "love" is actually about prostitution ("Pearl of the Quarter"), incest ("Cousin Dupree"), pornography ("Everyone's Gone to the Movies"), or some other socially unacceptable subject. However, some of their demo-era recordings show Fagen and Becker expressing romance, including "This Seat's Been Taken", "Oh, Wow, It's You" and "Come Back Baby".

Steely Dan's lyrics contain subtle and encoded references, unusual (and sometimes original) slang expressions, a wide variety of "word games." The obscure and sometimes teasing lyrics have given rise to considerable efforts by fans to explain the "inner meaning" of certain songs. Jazz is a recurring theme, and there are numerous other film, television and literary references and allusions, such as "Home at Last" (from Aja), which was inspired by Homer's Odyssey.

Members
Current members
 Donald Fagen – lead vocals, keyboards 

Former members
 Walter Becker – guitar, bass, backing and occasional lead vocals 
 Jeff "Skunk" Baxter – guitar, backing vocals 
 Denny Dias – guitar 
 Jim Hodder – drums, backing and lead vocals 
 David Palmer – backing and lead vocals 
 Royce Jones – backing vocals, percussion 
 Michael McDonald – keyboards, backing vocals 
 Jeff Porcaro – drums

Timeline
Current touring members

 Donald Fagen – lead vocals, keyboards, melodica
 Jon Herington – lead guitar, backing vocals, musical director 
 Adam Rogers – rhythm guitar
 Freddie Washington – electric bass
 Keith Carlock – drums
 Jim Beard – keyboards
 Roger Rosenberg – baritone saxophone
 Walt Weiskopf – tenor saxophone
 Michael Leonhart – trumpet, arranger
 Jim Pugh – trombone
 Catherine Russell – vocals
 Carolyn Leonhart – vocals
 La Tanya Hall – vocals

Discography

Studio albums

 Can't Buy a Thrill (1972)
 Countdown to Ecstasy (1973)
 Pretzel Logic (1974)
 Katy Lied (1975)
 The Royal Scam (1976)
 Aja (1977)
 Gaucho (1980)
 Two Against Nature (2000)
 Everything Must Go (2003)

See also
 List of songwriter tandems

References

External links

 

 
1971 establishments in New York (state)
American musical duos
American soft rock music groups
Bard College alumni
Crossover (music)
Giant Records (Warner) artists
Grammy Award winners
American jazz-rock groups
Jazz fusion ensembles
MCA Records artists
Male musical duos
Musical groups established in 1971
Musical groups disestablished in 1981
Musical groups reestablished in 1993
Reprise Records artists
Rock music duos
Rock music groups from New York (state)